In philosophy of law, free scientific research is a precursor of the jurisprudence of values. Free scientific research asserts that, in order to discover the origins of law's principles and rules, the interpreter's studies may have support on various "sciences" such as sociology, economics, linguistics, philosophy and theology, that previous law teachers had not used before.

Its main proponent was  François Gény, others like include Stamler and Eugen Ehrlich. This school of thought is also referred as the French school of interpretation and inherits aspects from Greek philosophy.

Concepts 
The free scientific school of thought intended to solve the contradictions of the exegesis school and improve the traditional juspositivism. One of its goals was to complete the "voids" of legal order fulfilling them with scientific elements, so denying law as the unique source of that order.

This paradigm emphasizes the use of equity as source of the law. The free scientific school has elements which have come from the philosophical school called the nature of things.

Distinction 
The free scientific school may not be identified to the natural law, they are different concepts. There can also be confusion between free scientific with free law. These two schools are not identical one to the other.

Bibliography

See also 
 Jurisprudence of concepts
 Jurisprudence of interests
 Philosophy of law
 Legal positivism
 Legal naturalism
 Hermeneutics

References 

Philosophy of law
Theories of law